Jacques-Louis Dumesnil (15 March 1882, in Paris – 15 June 1956, in Paris) was a French politician. He served as Minister of Air from 1931 to 1932.

Life
From an old Seine-et-Marne family, he initially worked as a journalist and lawyer at the Cour de Paris. He was elected a conseiller général for Seine-et-Marne aged 25 and a radical deputy for Seine-et-Marne aged 28 in 1910. He was re-elected in 1914 and remained in post until 1935.

He was mobilised for the First World War as a sous-lieutenant. During the course of the conflict he rose to lieutenant then captain, was wounded at the First Battle of the Marne and won the Légion d'honneur and the Croix de Guerre.

References

External links

http://www.assemblee-nationale.fr/sycomore/fiche.asp?num_dept=2699

1882 births
1956 deaths
Politicians from Paris
Radical Party (France) politicians
Independents of the Left politicians
French Naval Ministers
Members of the 10th Chamber of Deputies of the French Third Republic
Members of the 11th Chamber of Deputies of the French Third Republic
Members of the 12th Chamber of Deputies of the French Third Republic
Members of the 13th Chamber of Deputies of the French Third Republic
Members of the 14th Chamber of Deputies of the French Third Republic
Members of the 15th Chamber of Deputies of the French Third Republic
French Senators of the Third Republic
Senators of Seine-et-Marne
French Army officers
French military personnel of World War I
Chevaliers of the Légion d'honneur
Recipients of the Croix de Guerre 1914–1918 (France)
20th-century French journalists